German submarine U-668 was a Type VIIC U-boat of Nazi Germany's Kriegsmarine during World War II. The submarine was laid down on 11 October 1941 at the Howaldtswerke yard at Hamburg, launched on 5 October 1942, and commissioned on 16 November 1942 under the command of Oberleutnant zur See Wolfgang von Eickstedt.

Attached to 5th U-boat Flotilla based at Kiel, U-668 completed her training period on 31 March 1944 and was assigned to front-line service.

Design
German Type VIIC submarines were preceded by the shorter Type VIIB submarines. U-668 had a displacement of  when at the surface and  while submerged. She had two shafts and two  propellers.

U-668 was fitted with five  torpedo tubes (four fitted at the bow and one at the stern), fourteen torpedoes, one  SK C/35 naval gun, 220 rounds, and two twin  C/30 anti-aircraft guns. The boat had a complement of between forty-four and sixty.

Service history

U-668 completed six war patrols with no ships sunk.

Fate
The U-boat surrendered at Narvik, Norway on 9 May 1945.

References

Bibliography

External links

German Type VIIC submarines
1942 ships
Ships built in Hamburg
U-boats commissioned in 1942
Operation Deadlight
World War II submarines of Germany
Maritime incidents in December 1945